Bosnia and Herzegovina participated in the Eurovision Song Contest 1997 in Dublin, Ireland. Alma Čardžić represented Bosnia and Herzegovina with the song "Goodbye". They finished in an 18th place out of 25 countries with 22 points. Bosnia and Herzegovina shared this placement with Germany, as the tie-breaking rule at the time only affected the first place.

Before Eurovision 
Bosnia and Herzegovina had low average score over the previous four years, and so would have to withdraw, however Israel declined to participate, as the contest was held on its Holocaust Remembrance Day, so their place was awarded to Bosnia and Herzegovina, who ultimately competed.

BH Eurosong 1997 
The final was held on 22 February 1997 at the Bosnian TV Studios in Sarajevo. Alma Čardžić sang all the songs and the winner was chosen by an "expert" jury.

At Eurovision
Heading into the final of the contest, RTÉ reported that bookmakers ranked the entry 22nd out of the 25 entries. Alma Čardžić performed 14th on the night of the contest, following Estonia and preceding Portugal. At the close of voting it had received 22 points, placing joint 18th (with Germany) out of 25 entries. Due to a low average score over the past 5 contests, Bosnia and Herzegovina was forced to sit out the 1998 contest. The country returned to Eurovision in 1999.

Voting

References

1997
Countries in the Eurovision Song Contest 1997
Eurovision